"Love of the Common People" is a song written by John Hurley and Ronnie Wilkins, eventually released in 1970 on John Hurley's album John Hurley Sings about People, but first sung in January 1967 by the Four Preps. The Four Preps' recording was not a hit, but, later in 1967, the Everly Brothers and Wayne Newton would each issue their versions of the song, both of which "bubbled under" in the US charts; Newton's version peaked at No. 106, the Everlys' at No. 114.  However, the Everly Brothers' recording was a major hit in Canada, peaking at No. 4. In 1968, Irish artist Joe Dolan and backing grouping the Drifters recorded a version which hit the top 10 on the Irish Singles Chart, but did not chart elsewhere.

Soul group the Winstons recorded their version in 1969, where it peaked at No. 54 on the US Hot 100.  A year later, Nicky Thomas had a major UK hit (No. 9) with a reggae-inspired version, and Paul Young had a No. 2 UK hit (and No. 1 in several European countries) in 1983 with his interpretation of the song.

Lyrics

The lyrics tell a bleak story of poverty and unemployment. There is a mention of "free food tickets," a reference to government food stamp and welfare programs, in the very first line, and the lyrics also describe the subject family as having holes in their clothes, their roof and their shoes. The last verse advises the subject family to keep their faith strong and to maintain hope for improvement.

Nicky Thomas version
Nicky Thomas recorded a Joe Gibbs-produced reggae version of the song in 1970, which sold over 175,000 copies in the United Kingdom and reached number 9 on the UK Singles Chart. It was Thomas's largest selling single, and, according to Steve Leggett of AllMusic, "practically defines the term 'pop reggae.'"

Paul Young version

In 1982, English singer Paul Young released his interpretation of "Love of the Common People" as a single, but initially it failed to chart. Only after Young's first and second solo hits in 1983, with "Wherever I Lay My Hat (That's My Home)" and "Come Back and Stay", and the single's re-release did it become successful. The single peaked at No. 2 in the UK, and reached the No. 1 spot in Ireland, Italy and the Netherlands. This version also contained a solo by ska and reggae trombonist Rico Rodriguez.

Chart performance

Weekly charts

Year-end charts

Other versions
Soul group the Winstons recorded their version in 1969, where it peaked at No. 54 on the Hot 100.
It was also a top 10 hit in Ireland for showband star Joe Dolan in 1968.
Leonard Nimoy recorded a version on his second album Two Sides of Leonard Nimoy in 1968.
John Denver recorded a version on his album Rhymes & Reasons. 
Stiff Little Fingers recorded a version which appears on their album Now Then..., released in 1982.
Elton John recorded a version which appears on his covers album Chartbusters Go Pop, released in 1994.

See also
BRT Top 30 number-one hits of 1984
List of Dutch Top 40 number-one singles of 1984
List of number-one singles of 1983 (Ireland)
List of number-one hits of 1984 (Italy)

References

1966 songs
1967 singles
1969 singles
1970 singles
1983 singles
Joe Dolan songs
The Winstons songs
Paul Young songs
European Hot 100 Singles number-one singles
Irish Singles Chart number-one singles
Dutch Top 40 number-one singles
Number-one singles in the Netherlands
Ultratop 50 Singles (Flanders) number-one singles
Country ballads
Rhythm and blues ballads
Pop ballads
Songs about poverty
Capitol Records singles
CBS Records singles